Heras is a hamlet and alqueria located in the municipality of Casares de las Hurdes, in Cáceres province, Extremadura, Spain. As of 2020, it has a population of 27.

Geography 
Heras is located 184km north of Cáceres, Spain.

References

Populated places in the Province of Cáceres